Cormeilles-en-Parisis (literally Cormeilles in Parisis) is a commune in the Val-d'Oise department in Île-de-France in Northern France.

Inhabitants are called Cormeillais(e).

Neighbouring communes
 Argenteuil
 La Frette-sur-Seine
 Franconville
 Herblay
 Montigny-lès-Cormeilles
 Sannois
 Sartrouville

Population

Transport
Cormeilles-en-Parisis is served by Cormeilles-en-Parisis station on the Transilien Paris-Saint-Lazare suburban rail line.
It only takes 20 minutes to get to the station using ligne J from Paris Saint-Lazare.

International relations

Cormeilles-en-Parisis is twinned with Ware, United Kingdom.

Notable residents
Cormeilles-en-Parisis was the birthplace of:
 Louis Daguerre (1787–1851), artist and chemist who is recognized for his invention of the Daguerreotype process of photography
 Henri Cazalis (1840–1909), poet and man of letters
 Charles-Arthur Gonse (1838-1917), major general of the French Army, Figure in the Dreyfus affair.
 Robert Hue (born 1946), politician, former leader of French Communist Party (PCF)
 Boris Diaw (born 1982), former NBA player

See also

Communes of the Val-d'Oise department

References

External links

 Official website 

Association of Mayors of the Val d'Oise 

Communes of Val-d'Oise